Ken'ya or Kenya (written: 賢也, 賢哉, 研也, 研哉, 建也, 建哉, 健也, 健矢, 兼哉 or 謙弥) is a masculine Japanese given name. Notable people with the name include:

, Japanese politician
Kenya Fujinaka (born 1993), Japanese volleyball player
, Japanese graphic designer and curator
, Japanese gymnast
, Japanese footballer
, Japanese footballer
, Japanese footballer
, Japanese badminton player
, Japanese footballer
, Japanese footballer
, Japanese baseball player
, Japanese water polo player

See also
Kenya (given name)

Japanese masculine given names